Rudolph Schaeffer School of Design or Rudolph Schaeffer School of Rhythmo-Chromatic Design (1924 – 1984) was an art school located in San Francisco, California, best known for its courses in color and interior design. The school was founded by artist Rudolph Schaeffer.

History
The school founder, Rudolph Schaeffer had studied in Munich (1914 to 1915) through the United States Commission of Education, learn about the study of color, design, and craft and how it was being taught in public, industrial, and trade schools. He also studied color theory under Ralph Johonnot.

The Rudolph Schaeffer School of Design was an art school founded in 1924 in San Francisco, California. Originally named the Rudolph Schaeffer School of Rhythmo-Chromatic Design, located at 136 St. Anne Street in the Chinatown neighborhood of San Francisco. Other artists had studios in the Anne Street building, including Bertha Lum and Frances Revett Wallace.

In 1951 the school moved to Telegraph Hill. In the 1950s, in order to educate the public and students about Asian culture, Schaeffer invited Dr. Haridas Chaudhuri, founder of California Institute of Integral Studies (CIIS) to give public lectures at his East-West Arts Gallery.

By 1960 the school moved to Potrero Hill at 2255 Mariposa Street. In 1984 the school closed after financial issues and disagreements in terms of direction of the school between Schaeffer and the Board of Trustees.

Notable students 
A list of notable alumni from Rudolph Schaeffer School of Design, in alphabetical order by last name.
 Dorr Bothwell (1902–2002), artist, designer and author of "Notan – on the Interaction of Positive and Negative Spaces"
 Henry Doane (1905–1999), landscape painter and commercial artist
 Manny Farber (1917–2008), painter and writer
 Edward McNeil Farmer (1901–1969), painter and former professor at Stanford University.
 George Gaethke (1898–1982), WPA-era artist, painter, printmaker
 Dorothy Rieber Joralemon (1893–1987), sculptor
 Dorothy Wagner Puccinelli (1901–1974), WPA-era artist and muralist, enrolled in 1925
Raymond Puccinelli (1904–1986), sculptor, former professor of sculpture
 Lanette Scheeline (1910–2001) artist and textile designer
 Geraldine Knight Scott (1904–1989), landscape architect
 Michael Taylor (1927–1986), interior designer
 Louise Dahl-Wolfe (1895–1989), photographer - from Schaeffer's teachings at San Francisco Art Institute

References

External links 

 The Rudolph Schaeffer Papers 1880–1994, from the Archives of American Art, Smithsonian Institution

Art schools in California
Art in the San Francisco Bay Area
Universities and colleges in San Francisco
Design schools in the United States
Defunct private universities and colleges in California
1924 establishments in California
1984 disestablishments in California
Rudolph Schaeffer School of Design